John Winslow (October 21, 1825 – October 18, 1898) was an American lawyer.

Life 
Winslow was born on October 21, 1825 in Ramapo, New York, the son of Eleazor Robbins Winslow and Ann Corbett. His ancestor was Kenelm Winslow, younger brother of Plymouth Colony Governor Edward Winslow. One of Winslow's brothers was Worcester mayor Samuel Winslow.

When Winslow was sixteen months old, he and his family moved to Newton, Massachusetts. In 1843, he entered Holliston Academy in Holliston. He then went to Phillips Academy in Andover, followed by two years in Brown University. In 1850, he entered Harvard Law School, where his close friend and roommate was Edward L. Pierce. He graduated from there with an LL.B. in 1852. He then moved to Brooklyn, New York, where he was admitted to the bar later that year and began practicing with his brother D. C. Winslow.

In 1853, Winslow was appointed Assistant District Attorney under Harmanus B. Duryea. In 1855, he was appointed Corporation Counsel under Mayor George Hall and advised him on the consolidation of Brooklyn with Williamsburgh. In 1859, he was elected Brooklyn District Attorney as a Republican. In one year, he secured 315 convictions out of 329 indictments. He served in that office for three years. After his term expired, he returned to his law practice. In 1866 he formed a partnership with Joshua Van Cott, with law offices in New York City. In 1873, he was an unsuccessful Republican candidate for the New York Supreme Court, but a year later Governor Dix appointed him to fill a vacancy as Brooklyn District Attorney. In 1882, he moved his law practice to Brooklyn, where he worked until his death.

Winslow was one of the founders of the Long Island Historical Society, and for many years was its secretary and a director. He was an original member of the Hamilton Club, a life member of the Brooklyn Institute of Arts and Sciences, president of the Republican League of Brooklyn, and an original incorporator, original director, first vice-president, and president of the New England Society of Brooklyn. He was a member of the Plymouth Church for several years. In 1854, he married Sarah Miller Bennett. They had one surviving child, Everetta Robbins.

Winslow died at his home in Bay Ridge on October 18, 1898. He was buried in Newton Cemetery in Newton, Massachusetts.

References

External links 
John Winslow at Find a Grave

1825 births
1898 deaths
People from Ramapo, New York
People from Newton, Massachusetts
Phillips Academy alumni
Brown University alumni
Harvard Law School alumni
Kings County District Attorneys
19th-century American lawyers
New York (state) Republicans
Presbyterians from New York (state)
People from Bay Ridge, Brooklyn
Burials in Massachusetts